This was the first edition of the tournament.

Taylor Townsend and Yanina Wickmayer won the title after defeating Jennifer Brady and Vania King 6–4, 6–4 in the final.

Seeds

Draw

Draw

References
Main Draw

Oracle Challenger Series – Indian Wells - Doubles
Oracle Challenger Series – Indian Wells